Agder is a county (fylke) and traditional region in the southern part of Norway. The county was established on 1 January 2020, when the old Vest-Agder and Aust-Agder counties were merged. Since the early 1900s, the term Sørlandet ("south country, south land, southland") has been commonly used for this region, sometimes with the inclusion of neighbouring Rogaland. Before that time, the area was considered a part of Western Norway.

The area was a medieval petty kingdom, and after Norway's unification became known as Egdafylki and later Agdesiden, a county within the kingdom of Norway. The name Agder was not used after 1662, when the area was split into smaller governmental units called Nedenæs, Råbyggelaget, Lister, and Mandal. The name was resurrected in 1919 when two counties of Norway that roughly corresponded to the old Agdesiden county were renamed Aust-Agder (East Agder) and Vest-Agder (West Agder). Even before the two counties joined in 2020, they cooperated in many ways; the University of Agder had sites in both Aust-Agder and Vest-Agder, as did many other institutions, such as the Diocese of Agder og Telemark, the Agder Court of Appeal, and the Agder Police District.

Name
The name Agder is older than the Norwegian language. Its meaning is not known. Just as the Norwegian language derives from Old Norse, Agder derives from the Old Norse word Agðir.  In the early Viking Age, before Harald Fairhair, Agðir was a petty kingdom inhabited by a people named after it, the Egðir.

Nothing in Old Norse gives any hint as to the word's meaning; it was not produced (from known segments) in Old Norse, which means the name is older still. The Egðir are believed to be the same etymologically as the Augandzi people mentioned in the Getica of Jordanes, who wrote of Scandza (Scandinavia) in the 6th century. If Jordanes's Scandza is a palatalized form of *Scandia, then Augandzi is likely a palatalized form of *Augandii, residents of *Augandia.

A name of that period would have to be closer to Proto-Germanic; in fact, a word of that period does present itself and fits the geographical lore of the times: *agwjō (meaning "island"), which Jordanes and all his predecessors writing of Scandinavia believed it to be. A simple metathesis produces a possibly late form, *augjo-, but this derivation is speculative. There is no other evidence on Auganza, and its connection to Egder is hypothetical too.

Municipalities 
On 1 January 1838, the formannskapsdistrikt law went into effect, creating local municipalities all over Norway. The municipalities have changed over time through mergers and divisions as well as numerous boundary adjustments. When Agder county was established on 1 January 2020, it had 25 municipalities.

History
Norway of the Viking Age was divided into petty kingdoms ruled by chiefs who contended for land, maritime supremacy, or political ascendance and sought alliances or control through marriage with other royal families, either voluntary or forced. These circumstances produced the generally turbulent and heroic lives recorded in the Heimskringla.

For example, the Ynglinga saga tells us that Harald Redbeard, chief of Agðir, refused his daughter Åsa to Gudröd Halvdanson, on which event Gudröd invaded Agðir, killed Harald and his son Gyrd, and took Åsa whether she would or no. She bore a son, Halvdan (the Black), and later arranged to have Gudröd assassinated. Among the royal families, these events seem to have been rather ordinary. Her word was the last in the argument, as her grandson, Harald Fairhair, unified Norway.

Kings of Agder

Legendary Kings
 Harald Agderking 
 Víkar
 Kissa
 King Bjæring

Monarchs of Agder (790–987)
 Harald Granraude, 7??–815, father of Åsa
 Åsa, between 815 and 834–838, mother of Halfdan the Black
 Halfdan the Black, father of Harald Fairhair, from 838
 Kjotve the Rich, late 9th century
 Harald Gudrødsson Grenske, 976–987

Prior to the Viking Age is a gap in the region's history for a few hundred years, but in Jordanes we also find regions of the same but earlier forms of names, presumably also petty kingdoms under now unknown chiefs. The previous most credible source, Ptolemy, gives the briefest of sketches, only citing all of Norway as the Chaedini ("country people"). Perhaps the difference between kingdoms was not sufficiently important to cite them individually.

Prior to then the most credible and respected source, Tacitus in Germania Chapter 44 described the Suiones, who were divided into civitates (kingdoms?) along the coast of Scandinavia and were unusual in owning fleets of a special type of ship. These were pointed on both ends and were driven by banks of oars that could be rearranged or shipped for river passage. They did not depend on sail (so Tacitus says) but other than that they do not differ from Viking ships. These civitates went all the way around Scandinavia to the Arctic, or at least to regions of very long days, where they stopped.

It seems clear that in the Roman Iron Age Norway was populated by people of the same identity as Sweden, who were called the Suiones by Latin sources. In settling the coast at some point in prehistory they had been divided into civitates by the terrain. These states took on mainly geographical names or names of individuals or mythological characters. Agder was one of them.

After the unification of Norway by Harold Fairhair and army and allies in the 10th century, all the civitates became provinces (fylker) and after their conversion to Christianity, they became dioceses or parishes. The development of Old Norse into local dialects and the dissimilation of customs due to isolation added an ethnic flavor to the area, which is cherished today.

References

 
Counties of Norway
Petty kingdoms of Norway
2020 establishments in Norway
States and territories established in 2020